Sammach-e Miru (also Romanized as Sammāch-e Mīrū; also known as Sammāch) is a village in Negur Rural District, Dashtiari District, Chabahar County, Sistan and Baluchestan Province, Iran. At the 2006 census, its population was 420, in 81 families.

References 

Populated places in Chabahar County